Redwater was a provincial electoral district in Alberta mandated to return a single member to the Legislative Assembly of Alberta from 1940 to 1971 and again from 1993 to 2004.

History

Boundary history
Redwater was created in 1940 from most of the Sturgeon district and a part of Whitford, consisting of the area around Smoky Lake, with the North Saskatchewan River forming its southern boundary. When neighbouring Beaver River was abolished in 1952 a small portion was transferred to Redwater, but otherwise no boundary changes were made until the riding was abolished in 1971. It was replaced by the larger Redwater-Andrew.

In 1993, Redwater was created again out of most of Redwater-Andrew and the part of Westlock-Sturgeon containing Morinville. The new riding extended much further southwest than the original Redwater, touching the northern boundary of Edmonton. It underwent no boundary adjustments until abolished in 2004, with most of the riding transferred to Athabasca-Redwater and a small sliver to Barrhead-Morinville-Westlock.

Representation history
The riding's first MLA was James Popil, who had already served one term for Social Credit in Sturgeon and was re-elected twice in Redwater. He was succeeded by Peter Chaba, a Ukrainian immigrant, who also held the riding for two terms.

In 1955, however, Chaba was narrowly defeated by Liberal Alfred Macyk on the third count. The Social Credit government then abolished instant-runoff voting because of the Liberal Party's resurgence, and Macyk was defeated in 1959 by their candidate, John Dubetz.

When Dubetz decided not to run again in 1963, Social Credit chose Michael Senych as their candidate. He held the riding for two terms, until it was abolished in 1971.

When Redwater was re-created in 1993, two incumbent MLAs ran against each other: former Liberal leader and two-term MLA for Westlock-Sturgeon, Nicholas Taylor, faced off against Steve Zarusky, two-term PC MLA for Redwater-Andrew. Taylor won by a significant margin, and three years later was subsequently appointed to the Senate by Jean Chrétien. The resulting 1996 by-election was won by another Liberal, Mary Anne Balsillie, by a razor-thin margin.

However, the governing Progressive Conservatives would capture the riding in the following year, with candidate Dave Broda defeating Balsillie in an equally close contest. He was re-elected in 2001 by a much larger margin, and retired from politics when Redwater was abolished in 2004.

Election results

1940s

|}

|}

|-
!colspan=6|Second count

|colspan=2|Neither
|align=right|292

|}

1950s

|-
!colspan=6|Second count

|colspan=2|Neither
|align=right|766

|}

|-
!colspan=6|Second count

|colspan=2|Neither
|align=right|379

|}
After the 1955 election, a historic breakthrough for the Liberal Party, the government of Ernest Manning abolished alternative vote and introduced first past the post voting across the province. The Social Credit candidate in Redwater was therefore able to win with less than a majority of votes in 1959. This change can also be seen in the dramatic drop in spoiled (incorrectly marked) ballots.

|}

1960s

|}

|}

See Redwater-Andrew and Westlock-Sturgeon for results in the 1970s and 1980s.

1990s

|}

|}

|}

2000s

 

|}

Plebiscite results

1957 liquor plebiscite

On October 30, 1957, a stand-alone plebiscite was held province wide in all 50 of the then current provincial electoral districts in Alberta. The government decided to consult Alberta voters to decide on liquor sales and mixed drinking after a divisive debate in the legislature. The plebiscite was intended to deal with the growing demand for reforming antiquated liquor control laws.

The plebiscite was conducted in two parts. Question A, asked in all districts, asked the voters if the sale of liquor should be expanded in Alberta, while Question B, asked in a handful of districts within the corporate limits of Calgary and Edmonton, asked if men and women should be allowed to drink together in establishments.

Province wide Question A of the plebiscite passed in 33 of the 50 districts while Question B passed in all five districts. Redwater voted in favour of the proposal with a landslide majority. Voter turnout in the district was abysmal, falling well below the province wide average of 46%.

Official district returns were released to the public on December 31, 1957. The Social Credit government in power at the time did not consider the results binding. However the results of the vote led the government to repeal all existing liquor legislation and introduce an entirely new Liquor Act.

Municipal districts lying inside electoral districts that voted against the plebiscite were designated Local Option Zones by the Alberta Liquor Control Board and considered effective dry zones. Business owners twhohat wanted a license had to petition for a binding municipal plebiscite in order to be granted a license.

See also
List of Alberta provincial electoral districts

References

Further reading

External links
Elections Alberta
The Legislative Assembly of Alberta

Former provincial electoral districts of Alberta